Iowa Highway 17 (Iowa 17) is a  north–south state highway that traverses primarily rural areas in central and north-central Iowa. Iowa 17's southern end is near Granger in Dallas County at a freeway interchange with Iowa Highway 141, and its northern terminus is at an intersection with U.S. Highway 18 at the Kossuth-Hancock county line near Wesley.

Route description

Iowa Highway 17 begins at a trumpet interchange with Iowa Highway 141 near Granger. It goes north to Madrid, where it intersects Iowa Highway 210. It continues north through Luther and then intersects U.S. Highway 30 east of Boone. It proceeds north from U.S. 30 and has a one-mile (1.6 km) overlap with Iowa Highway 175 in Stanhope. It goes north, then turns northwest to go towards Webster City, and intersects U.S. Highway 20 there. They overlap going west from Webster City, then Iowa 17 turns north to go through Eagle Grove. It continues north to Goldfield, where it intersects Iowa Highway 3. Iowa 17 and Iowa 3 overlap to the border between Wright and Humboldt Counties, then Iowa 17 turns north. It passes through Renwick and Corwith, then ends on the border separating Hancock and Kossuth Counties east of Wesley.

History

Although Iowa 17 has only been designated since 1969, most of the route has been a part of the primary highway system since the system's inception in 1919.  The route was designated Primary Road No. 60 and connected Des Moines and Goldfield via Webster City.  By 1930, the only paved section of what was by then called Iowa 60 was the southernmost  from Des Moines to south of Madrid.  In two years, paving extended to US 30 east of Boone.

1932 saw many changes to Iowa 60.  The route was extended  to the north where it ended at US 18 in Wesley, and extended southward through Des Moines and Knoxville to the Missouri state line, effectively doubling its length.  The section of Iowa 60 south of Des Moines is now known as Iowa 5.

Little changed in the Iowa 60 north of Des Moines over the next twenty years. By 1957, that paving extended to the northern end at US 18.

On January 1, 1969, the Iowa State Highway Commission renumbered several state highways in the state.  They sought to create continuous numbers across state lines and remove unnecessary duplicate route numbers where they could.  Since it crossed the state line into Missouri, the southern half of the route was renumbered Iowa 5 to match Missouri Route 5.  Throughout Des Moines, Iowa 60 overlapped many other routes, so the designation was removed between the I-35/now-Iowa 5 interchange to the intersection with Iowa 141 in Granger.  The section of Iowa 60 north of Granger became Iowa 17.

Since becoming Iowa 17, the route has changed little.  By 1976, paving was completed and the southern end of the route was converted into an interchange with Iowa 141.  By the end of the 1970s, the highway was rerouted around Webster City when US 20 was realigned onto a new freeway.

Major intersections

References

017